In the 2002 NCAA Division I Men's Lacrosse National Championship game, Syracuse defeated Princeton by a score of 13-12. The game was a rematch of the 2001 championship game, which was won by Princeton. This time, Syracuse was victorious, led by Michael Powell's four goals and three assists.

Overview 

Same teams, different results, Syracuse beat Princeton 13 to 12 in a rematch of the 2001 championship, defeating the Tigers for a record-tying seventh official championship and second in three years. 

For Princeton, the defending champion, the loss snapped a 12-game tournament win streak in games decided by one goal. The Tigers only previous tournament loss in such a game was in 1991, prior to the first of Princeton's six national titles.

Michael Powell, who was named the tournament most outstanding player and later would be named national
player of the year, scored the game-winner with 11:35 left in the game. Syracuse won three straight one-goal games in the tournament, and the win gave head coach John Desko his second championship in four years

All-Tournament Team: Michael Powell, Solomon Bliss, John Glatzel, Tom Hardy and Jay Pfeifer of
Syracuse; Damien Davis, Brad Dumont and B.J. Prager of Princeton; Adam Doneger of Johns Hopkins;
and Johnny Christmas of Virginia.

Bracket 

 * = Overtime

See also
2002 NCAA Division I Women's Lacrosse Championship
2002 NCAA Division II Men's Lacrosse Championship
2002 NCAA Division III Men's Lacrosse Championship

References

External links 
Title Game Writeup
YouTube 2002 NCAA Men's Lacrosse National Championship

NCAA Division I Men's Lacrosse Championship
NCAA Division I Men's Lacrosse Championship
NCAA Division I Men's Lacrosse Championship
NCAA Division I Men's Lacrosse Championship
Lacrosse in New Jersey